British singer Sophie Ellis-Bextor has released six solo studio albums, one live album, two compilation albums, one remix album, one extended play, one video album, thirty-five singles (including eight as a featured performer) and twenty-seven music videos. Ellis-Bextor debuted in 1997 as frontwoman of the indie music group theaudience, whose single "I Know Enough (I Don't Get Enough)" reached the top 25 on the United Kingdom singles chart. They released a self-titled album—a follow up was shelved by label Mercury Records although selected tracks circulate as bootlegs.

Her solo debut album, Read My Lips, was released in September 2001. The album reached number two on the UK Albums Chart and was certified double platinum by the British Phonographic Industry (BPI). The record experienced international success; it sold more than 1.5 million albums worldwide. It produced four singles, three of which reached the top three in the UK. Ellis-Bextor's second album, Shoot from the Hip, was released in October 2003. The album reached number nineteen in the UK and produced two top ten singles. Trip the Light Fantastic, her third album, was released in May 2007. It album reached number seven in the UK. The album produced three singles, one of which reached the top ten in the UK.

In 2009, Ellis-Bextor collaborated with dance music group Freemasons on the single "Heartbreak (Make Me a Dancer)", which reached the top 20 in the UK. Her fourth studio album, Make a Scene was released in 2011, charting at number 33 on the UK Albums Chart.

For her fifth studio album, Wanderlust, Ellis-Bextor moved to a different style. The album, filled with ballads and folk songs, was released on 20 January 2014 and debuted at number 4 in the UK and at number one on the UK Indie Albums chart. The lead single, "Young Blood", also made the Top 40 on the Official Singles Chart and top five on the Indie Chart.

Albums

Studio albums

Live albums

Remix albums

Compilation albums

Extended plays

Singles

As lead artist

As featured artist

Promotional singles

Other appearances

Video albums

Music videos

As lead artist

As featured artist

See also
 List of songs recorded by Sophie Ellis-Bextor

References

External links
 Official website
 Sophie Ellis-Bextor at AllMusic
 
 

Pop music discographies
Discographies of British artists
Discography